The International Film Music Critics Association Award for Best Original Score for a Video Game or Interactive Media is an annual award given by the International Film Music Critics Association (IFMCA). Established in 2007, the award is given to the composer of a video game score based on two criteria: "the effectiveness, appropriateness and emotional impact of the score in the context of the film for which it was written; and the technical and intellectual merit of the composition when heard as a standalone listening experience."  The awarding period runs January 1 through December 31 every year, and IFMCA members vote for the winner the following February.

, 52 composers have been nominated for the International Film Music Critics Association Award for Best Original Score for a Video Game or Interactive Media.  The first award was given to John Debney for his work on the video game Lair.  The most recent recipients were Mark Mothersbaugh and Wataru Hokoyama for their work on the video game Ratchet & Clank: Rift Apart.  Austin Wintory has been nominated eight times and won three; he is the only composer to have been nominated twice in the same year, which happened in 2016.  Four other composers (Chris Tilton, Bear McCreary, Neal Acree, and Olivier Deriviere) have been nominated four times.



Winners and nominees

In the tables below, winners are marked by a light green background and a double-dagger symbol.

2000s

2010s

2020s

References

International Film Music Critics Association Awards